Townsend Harris Hall Prep School was a public preparatory school located in Manhattan in New York City.

History
The school is named for Townsend Harris, who besides his many diplomatic accomplishments, had helped found the Free Academy of the City of New York, later to become City College, and was a strong proponent of free education.  Townsend Harris was formed in 1849 as a one-year preparatory school for CUNY.  The Free Academy's introductory year gradually evolved and in 1904 became a full-fledged, 3-year high school, housed on three floors of what is now Baruch College (in the East Side Manhattan neighborhood of Kips Bay). The school was the most selective school in New York.  It required entrance exams to enter into the school. The school was still in its quarters at 23d Street and Lexington Avenue, occupying a spartan campus on the 9th to 12th floors of the building which now houses CUNY's Baruch College.   Those who graduated from Townsend Harris were guartenteed a spot in the College of the City of New York.  It moved to Harlem, NY in 1906.  In 1930 as a result of over crowding, the school moved back to 23rd St. The school operated as an All Boys School for its duration.  The school had a significant amount of Jewish and Eastern European students.  Most students were ready to graduate by the age of 15/16.

Academics
Townsend Harris condensed four years of high school into three.  From here students would automatically get accepted into the City College of New York.  The school eventually gained a reputation as being elitist and obsolete.  At its time, it was considered to be NYC's most prestigious examination school.

Closing
This original incarnation, known as Townsend Harris Hall, survived until 1942 when it was closed by mayor Fiorello La Guardia for budgetary reasons.  Although it is speculated it was closed because a relative of Mayor Laguardia was not admitted to the school. New York City eliminated 75 teachers and 1000 students with its closing. Townsend Harris closed with about 10,000 graduates.  In 1980, a group of alumni from Townsend Harris Hall went on a mission to reopen the school. In 1984, a school was opened in Queens, NY, and associated with Queens College which took on a similar name of Townsend Harris High School.

Notable alumni

Scholars
 Manfred Halpern, political scientist expert in modern Middle East
 Donald M. Friedman was a scholar of English Renaissance literature at the University of California, Berkeley

Science and technology
 Morton Deutsch (1920-2017), social psychologist who was one of the founding fathers of the field of conflict resolution.
 Theodore Hall ('40), physicist and one of the most infamous atomic spies for the Soviet Union. 
 Herbert Hauptman ('33), mathematician who shared the 1985 Nobel Prize for Chemistry for his application of mathematical models to determine crystal structures.
 Robert Jastrow, cosmologist and author who was first director of NASA's Lunar Exploration Committee and the first director of the Goddard Institute for Space Studies.
 Sidney H. Liebson ('35), physicist and inventor of the Halogen Geiger Counter. Developed the first equipment used to detect enemy radar, for which he received a U.S. Navy award.
 William Nierenberg ('35), physicist known for holding several government posts in addition to serving as director of the Scripps Institution of Oceanography and co-founding the George C. Marshall Institute.
 Gilbert Jerome Perlow, physicist who was a pioneer in studies of the Mössbauer effect. He later served as editor of the Journal of Applied Physics.
 Jonas Salk ('31), virologist and medical researcher best known for producing the first safe and effective polio vaccine.
 Julian Schwinger ('33), theoretical physicist who shared the 1965 Nobel Prize in Physics for his work in developing QED theory.

Writing and journalism
 Robert Bleiberg, former managing editor and publisher of Barron's 
Bennett Cerf (1898-1971), publisher who was one of the founders of American publishing firm Random House.
 Lawrence Cremin ('41), educational historian who received the 1981 Pulitzer Prize for History for American Education: The National Experience, 1783-1876.
 Irwin Edman, professor of philosophy, author, and mentor.
 Paul Goodman ('27)
 Hy Hollinger, editor and journalist covering the entertainment industry, international editor of The Hollywood Reporter (1992–2008).
 John F. Kieran, columnist for the New York Times and panelist on the radio show Information Please
 Sidney Kingsley ('24) was a dramatist (The Patriots, Detective Story, Darkness at Noon).  He received the 1934 Pulitzer Prize for Drama, for Men in White.
 Samuel Menashe ('42)
 Irving Singer was a professor of philosophy at MIT. 
 Anatole Shub was an author, journalist, editor, and analyst who was an expert on Russian society during the Soviet era.
 William Steig ('22)
 Herman Wouk ('30) is an author (The Winds of War, War and Remembrance). He won the 1952 Pulitzer Prize for Fiction for his novel The Caine Mutiny.

Performing arts and entertainment
 Mason Adams was an actor best known for the TV series Lou Grant and his voice-over work in animation and commercials.
 Army Archerd ('37) was a columnist and blogger for Variety (1953–2009).
 Bennett Cerf was a publisher and humorist also known for being a panelist on the TV quiz show What's My Line? 
 Warren Cowan was a Hollywood publicist, and co-founder of the public relations firm Rogers & Cowan.
 Howard Dietz was a lyricist, best known for his collaborations with composer Arthur Schwartz. Among his songs are "Dancing in the Dark" and "That's Entertainment!".
 Ervin Drake ('35) was a composer and lyricist ("I Believe", "Good Morning Heartache", and "It Was a Very Good Year"). Drake also composed the school's Alma Mater.
 Ira Gershwin was a lyricist, best known for songs written with his brother George Gershwin ("I Got Rhythm", "Embraceable You", and "Someone to Watch Over Me"). He also collaborated on the libretto of Porgy and Bess.
 Yip Harburg was a lyricist known for writing songs such as "Brother, Can You Spare a Dime?", "April in Paris", and "It's Only a Paper Moon". He also wrote all of the songs for The Wizard of Oz, most notably "Over the Rainbow".
 Mark Hellinger (expelled) was a film and stage columnist and film producer.
 Sam Jaffe was an actor known for films like Gunga Din and The Asphalt Jungle and the TV series Ben Casey
 Frank Loesser is an Oscar, Tony, and Pulitzer prize award-winning composer and songwriter best known for Guys and Dolls and How to Succeed in Business Without Really Trying.
 Edward G. Robinson ('10) was an actor known for films like Little Caesar, Double Indemnity, Key Largo and The Ten Commandments.
 Richard Rodgers (attended) was a composer, best known for his work with lyricist Oscar Hammerstein II (Oklahoma!, The King and I, The Sound of Music).
 Charles Strouse ('43) is an Emmy, Grammy, and Tony Award-winning composer and lyricist best known for composing the musicals Bye Bye Birdie and Annie, as well as film scores (Bonnie and Clyde), and the song "Those Were the Days" for the TV series All in the Family.
 Joseph Vogel was a former president of Metro-Goldwyn-Mayer.
 Clifton Webb is a Golden Globe winning actor (The Razor's Edge, Laura, Three Coins in the Fountain).
 Bernie West was a television writer (All in the Family, The Jeffersons)
 Cornel Wilde was a director and actor (The Greatest Show on Earth, A Thousand and One Nights, The Naked Prey).

Business, economics, and philanthropy
 Kenneth Arrow ('36) is an economist who shared the 1972 Nobel Memorial Prize in Economic Sciences for his work on social choice theory.  He proposed his eponymous Arrow's impossibility theorem.
 Eugene Lang ('34) is a philanthropist, associated with Project Pericles, among others. The Eugene Lang College The New School for Liberal Arts is named for him, and he received the Presidential Medal of Freedom in 1996.
 Leon Levy ('39) was a financial analyst and hedge fund pioneer with Oppenheimer & Co. (1951–82). He was a philanthropist, predominantly in education, art, and archaeology.
 Alexander Sachs was a banker and economist, best known for delivering the Einstein–Szilárd letter to Franklin Roosevelt, and convincing him to begin research into the construction of a nuclear weapon. 
Bernard L. Schwartz (c:a 1936) businessman and Democrat donor activist. 
 George Weissman was a businessman and philanthropist who served as president of Phillip Morris USA.

Law, politics, and activism
 Felix S. Cohen was a lawyer, legal scholar, and activist who specialized in federal law as it related to Native Americans.
Joseph H. Flom was an American lawyer and last surviving named founder of Skadden, Arps, Slate, Meagher & Flom
 Felix Frankfurter was an Associate Justice of the Supreme Court of the United States (1939–62).
 Rudolph Halley was an attorney who worked on both the Truman Committee (investigating defense spending waste) and Kefauver Committee (investigating organized crime). He served as President of the New York City Council (1951–53).
James Male was a lawyer and member of the New York State Assembly.
 Robert N.C. Nix Sr. was a United States Congressman (1958–79). He was the first African-American Congressman elected from Pennsylvania.
 Maurice Paprin '36 A prominent NYC real estate developer who got his start in the business building multi-family apartment buildings in the Borough of Queens. He was a leading figure during President Johnson's Great Society Program and was responsible for bringing to market thousands of high quality affordable housing units in NYC. Most notable among them was the creation of the Schomburg Plaza Apartment Houses on 110th St. & Fifth Ave in Manhattan.
 Adam Clayton Powell Jr. was a United States Congressman (1945–71). He was the first person of African-American descent elected to Congress from New York.
 Igal Roodenko was a printer, a radical pacifist, a member of the executive committee of the War Resisters League from 1944 through 1977, and its director from 1968 through 1972.
 Robert Wagner was a U.S. Senator from New York (1927–49). He was responsible for proposing many pieces of New Deal legislation, and several important bills from that era bear his name.
 Nily Rozic is a New York State Assemblywoman
Sol Ullman was a lawyer, New York State Assemblyman, and assistant attorney general.
 William A. Zeck, a retired New York State judge and political official who was a prosecutor at the Nuremberg war-crimes trials

References

External links

Defunct high schools in Manhattan
Former school buildings in the United States
Magnet schools in New York (state)
 
Public high schools in Manhattan
Specialized high schools in New York City
University-affiliated schools in the United States